Donn is the Lord of the Dead in Irish mythology.

Donn may also refer to:

 Donn (given name), masculine given name and byname in Irish
 Donn (surname)
 Donn-Byrne
 Donn Cuailnge, a magical bull from Irish mythology
 Donn Handicap
 4689 Donn, a main-belt asteroid
 FK Donn, a Norwegian football club

See also
Dôn, the Welsh mother goddess